Homme is a surname.  Notable people with the surname include:

Bob Homme (1919–2000), American-Canadian television actor
Josh Homme (born 1973), American rock musician
Robert O. Homme (born  1941), American diplomat

See also
Nienke Hommes (born 1977), Dutch rower